Cristina Paluselli (born 23 October 1973) is a former professional Italian cross-country skier.

Biography
Paluselli won ten FIS Worldloppet Cup races, and was ranked first for two consecutive years, during the 2004 and 2005.

As member of the Italian National Team, she won a bronze medal in the 4 × 5 km relay at the 2001 FIS Nordic World Ski Championships in Lahti and had her best individual finish of 16th in the 15 km at the 2003 FIS Nordic World Ski Championships.

Paluselli's best individual finish at the Winter Olympics was 39th in the 10 km both in 2002 and 2006. She has eleven individual victories at various distances, mainly at the FIS Marathon Cup, from 2002 to 2006. She was the winner in the most prestigious ski marathons such as Jizerska Padesatka, Bedřichov, Oberammergau, Marcialonga, Livigno, Rena - Lillehammer, and Vasaloppet. Her Vasaloppet victory came in 2005.

Cross-country skiing results
All results are sourced from the International Ski Federation (FIS).

Olympic Games

World Championships
 1 medal – (1 bronze)

a.  Cancelled due to extremely cold weather.

World Cup

Season standings

Team podiums

 2 victories – (2 ) 
 6 podiums – (6 )

References

External links

1973 births
Living people
Italian female cross-country skiers
Cross-country skiers at the 2002 Winter Olympics
Cross-country skiers at the 2006 Winter Olympics
Olympic cross-country skiers of Italy
FIS Nordic World Ski Championships medalists in cross-country skiing
Italian sky runners